One Man Clapping is the third album from English band James, a live album released in March 1989. The album was recorded at the Moles Club, Bath, UK on the 14 and 15 November 1988. The album was issued on their own One Man imprint of Rough Trade Records, after parting company with Blanco y Negro/Sire. To fund the album, the band had to borrow £12,000 from the Royal Bank of Scotland. Initially, the bank manager was not willing to lend the band the money, but after seeing them live in Manchester he agreed.

Because the album was self-funded, only 10,000 CD copies were produced; this has made the album highly sought after by collectors. Copies have been known to trade hands on eBay for in excess of £100.

Track listing
 "Chain Mail" – 3:26
 "Sandman (Hup-Springs)" – 3:43
 "Whoops" – 3:26
 "Riders" – 3:35
 "Leaking" – 4:09
 "Why So Close" – 4:10
 "Ya Ho" – 4:45 (not on vinyl version of album)
 "Johnny Yen" – 3:43
 "Scarecrow" – 2:49
 "Are You Ready" – 2:59
 "Really Hard" – 4:23
 "Burned" – 4:29
 "Stutter" – 5:33

Release details 

 UK 12" Vinyl – One Man/Rough Trade Records (ONE MAN 1 LP)
 UK Cassette – One Man/Rough Trade Records (ONE MAN 1 C)
 UK CD – One Man/Rough Trade Records (ONE MAN 1 CD)
This album was pressed onto cd by MPO France.

Personnel

James 

 Tim Booth
 Larry Gott
 Jim Glennie
 Gavan Whelan

Additional musicians

 Mick Armistead – keyboards

References

External links 
 Official James Website

James (band) live albums
1989 live albums
Rough Trade Records live albums